The men's 58 kg  competition in taekwondo at the 2000 Summer Olympics in Sydney took place on 27 September at the State Sports Centre.

Greece's Michalis Mouroutsos handily defeated the Spaniard Gabriel Esparza with a score of 4–2 to take the gold in the men's flyweight class. The bronze medal was awarded to Chinese Taipei's Huang Chih-hsiung, who overwhelmed Argentina's Gabriel Taraburelli for a 3–0 victory in the repechage.

Competition format
The main bracket consisted of a single elimination tournament, culminating in the gold medal match. The taekwondo fighters eliminated in earlier rounds by the two finalists of the main bracket advanced directly to the repechage tournament. These matches determined the bronze medal winner for the event.

Schedule
All times are Greece Standard Time (UTC+2)

Competitors

Results
Legend
PTG — Won by points gap
SUP — Won by superiority
OT — Won on over time (Golden Point)
WO — Walkover

Main bracket

Repechage

References

External links
Official Report

Men's 058 kg
Men's events at the 2000 Summer Olympics